The 1999 China International was a professional ranking snooker tournament that took place from 8–14 March 1999 at the JC Mandarin Hotel in Shanghai, China. The tournament was the inaugural staging of the event as a ranking tournament, after the 1997 edition had previously been held as an invitational tournament. This edition was the seventh ranking event out of the 1998/1999 season.

John Higgins won the tournament by defeating Billy Snaddon 9–3 in the final. Mehmet Husnu recorded a maximum break against Eddie Barker during qualifying for the tournament.

Prize fund
The breakdown of prize money for this year is shown below: 

Winner: £42,000
Runner-up: £21,000
Semi-final: £11,000
Quarter-final: £6,200
Last 16: £3,100
Last 32: £2,555

Highest break (televised): £2,500
Highest break (qualifying): £1,000

Wildcard round

Main draw

References

1999
China Open
Open (snooker)
Sports competitions in Shanghai